Jean-Jacques Delbo (10 January 1909 – 20 May 1996) was a French actor. He appeared in more than sixty films from 1936 to 1990.

Filmography

References

External links 

1909 births
1996 deaths
French male film actors